Dreams of a Love is the debut studio album by Australian pop-rock band, the Ferrets. Released in October 1977, it peaked at number 20 on the Australian Kent Music Report albums chart. Its production was started by Ian "Molly" Meldrum under the pseudonym, Willie Everfinish – after almost a year the group, assisted by audio engineers Tony Cohen and Ian MacKenzie, finalised the work.

Background 

The Ferrets had formed in 1975 and early in the following year they recorded a demo tape, which they sent to Ian "Molly" Meldrum, talent coordinator for Australian Broadcasting Corporation (ABC) pop music TV series, Countdown. Meldrum had them signed to Mushroom Records and started producing their debut album, Dreams of a Love, in July 1976.

After nearly a year, production of the album was still incomplete, so the Ferrets took over — assisted by recording engineers, Tony Cohen and Ian MacKenzie — Meldrum was attributed as "Willie Everfinish". In June 1977 they released "Don't Fall in Love" as a single, which they performed on Countdown, it peaked at No. 2 on the Kent Music Report singles chart. Dreams of a Love followed in October and achieved gold record status. The album cover depicted a model, Wendy Bannister, holding a snarling ferret at her shoulder.

Track listing

LP/Cassette

Personnel 

The Ferrets
 Philip Eizenberg – guitar
 Kenneth Firth – bass guitar, backing vocals
 William "Billy" Miller – lead vocals, guitar, strings (arranger)
 David Springfield – guitar
 Rick Brewer – drums, percussion
 Jane Miller – backing vocals, keyboards
 Pam Miller – backing vocals

Additional musicians
 Kevin Kasey – choir conductor
 David Springfield – guitar, backing vocals
 Dave Clarke – flute (track 13)
 Brian Godden – banjo (track 6)
 Chris Harold – synthesiser (tracks 7, 12)
 Nicky Hopkins – piano, voice (track 3)
 Peter Jones – strings arranger (tracks 1, 7, 9, 12–13)
 Bobby Keys – saxophone (track 2)
 Ian Mason – synthesiser (track 7)
 Ian Mawson – piano (tracks 2, 5, 7, 9, 11), organ (track 12)
 National Boys Choir – choir vocals (tracks 7, 11–12)
 Manny Paterakis – percussion (track 7)
 Peter Whitford – percussion (tracks 5, 9, 11)

Recording details
 Audio engineer – Tony Cohen, Ian McKenzie
 Producer – Willie Everfinish, the Ferrets

Art works
 Artwork – Bill Burrows, Mushroom Art, Steve Malpass
 Illustration – George Lazerides
 Photograph, cover – Derek Hughes

Charts

References

Mushroom Records albums
1977 debut albums